Suncoast may refer to:
 Florida Suncoast, a 1980s marketing term for peninsular (non-panhandle) Florida's Gulf of Mexico coastal counties 
 Florida Suncoast Dome, the original name of Tropicana Field in St. Petersburg, Florida
 Suncoast Center, Inc., nonprofit community mental health agency in Pinellas County
 Suncoast Conference, western central Florida college athletic league
 Suncoast Credit Union, the largest credit union in Florida, based in Tampa
 Suncoast Estates, census-designated place in Lee County, southwest Florida
 Suncoast Parkway, toll road in western central Florida
Suncoast Trail, recreational trail developed alongside the Suncoast Parkway
 Suncoast Seabird Sanctuary, bird sanctuary in Pinellas County, Florida
 Suncoast Suns, former ice hockey team in St. Petersburg, Florida
 Pinellas Suncoast Transit Authority, the public bus system in Pinellas County
 Suncoast Casino and Entertainment World, hotel and casino complex situated on the beach in Durban, South Africa
 Suncoast Chapter of NATAS (Emmy Awards) which serves Florida; several cities in Alabama, Georgia, & Louisiana; plus Puerto Rico
 Suncoast Christian College, on the Sunshine Coast, Queensland, Australia
 Suncoast Classic, golf tournament in Durban, South Africa
 Suncoast Community High School, public high school in Riviera Beach, Florida, on the Atlantic coast
 Suncoast Hotel and Casino, hotel in Las Vegas, Nevada
 Suncoast Motion Picture Company, a U.S. chain of stores specializing in movies and related gift items

See also
 Gulf Coast (disambiguation)